Ballyshannon (CDJ) railway station served Ballyshannon in County Donegal, Ireland.

The station opened on 21 September 1905 as the terminus of the Donegal Railway Company line from Donegal to Ballyshannon.

It closed on 1 January 1960.

References

Disused railway stations in County Donegal
Railway stations opened in 1905
Railway stations closed in 1960
1905 establishments in Ireland
Railway stations in the Republic of Ireland opened in the 20th century